The 4th Psychological Operations Group (Airborne) (or 4th POG)(A) is one of the United States Army's active military information support operations units along with the 8th Psychological Operations Group (Airborne), which was activated 26 August 2011 at Fort Bragg. The 8th Group has responsibility for the 1st, 5th and 9th Psychological Operations battalions. The 4th Group has responsibility for the 3rd, 6th, 7th and 8th battalions, with a total of about 800 soldiers.

On 21 June 2010, an announcement was made that the military intends to rename psychological operations, or PSYOP, to Military Information Support Operations.  The decision, made a few days earlier by Admiral Eric Olson, Commander, United States Special Operations Command and Army's Chief of Staff General George Casey, was propagated through a memo dated 23 June 2010. By October 2017, the U.S. Army Special Operations Command (USASOC) reverted its decision changing their name back to PSYOP stating, "Psychological operations refers to the name of units, while MISO refers to the function that soldiers in PSYOP units perform".

The unit is based at Fort Bragg, North Carolina and is a part of the 1st Special Forces Command (Airborne), under the United States Army Special Operations Command. The 4th POG was constituted 7 November 1967 in the Regular Army as Headquarters and Headquarters Company, 4th Psychological Operations Group. Originally activated 1 December 1967 in Vietnam, it was inactivated 2 October 1971 at Fort Lewis, Washington, and reactivated 13 September 1972 at Fort Bragg.

Campaign participation credits

Vietnam
Counteroffensive, Phase III
Tet Counteroffensive
Counteroffensive, Phase IV
Counteroffensive, Phase V
Counteroffensive, Phase VI
Tet 69/Counteroffensive
Summer-Fall 1969
Winter-Spring 1970
Sanctuary Counteroffensive
Counteroffensive, Phase VII
Consolidation I

Armed forces expeditions
Grenada
Somalia
Haiti
Panama

Southwest Asia
Defense of Saudi Arabia;
Liberation and Defense of Kuwait
Southwest Asia Cease-Fire

Organization
4th POG(A) currently consists of a headquarters company and three regional PSYOP battalions (POB) and one dissemination battalion. The 3rd POB is currently part of 4th POG(A) that supports both 4th POG(A) and 8th POG(A) and provides both with radio, television, digital-audio-visual and print assets for developing MISO products such as leaflets, posters, handbills, newspapers, radio and television broadcasts. The three regional POBs are regionally oriented and support the regional combatant commands in the planning and production of MISO programs:

 3rd POB(A) - Dissemination

 6th POB(A) – United States European Command (EUCOM)
Constituted 20 October 1965 in the Regular Army as the 6th Psychological Operations Battalion
Activated 1 November 1965 in Vietnam
Inactivated 30 June 1971 in Vietnam
Activated 13 September 1972 at Fort Bragg, North Carolina
Reorganized and redesignated 16 March 1990 as Headquarters and Headquarters Company, 6th Psychological Operations Battalion
Reorganized and redesignated 16 November 1995 as Headquarters, Headquarters and Service Company, 6th Psychological Operations Battalion (organic elements concurrently constituted and activated with personnel from provisional units)

 7th POB(A) – United States Africa Command (AFRICOM)

Constituted 23 December 1943 in the Regular Army as the 3rd Mobile Radio Broadcast Company
Activated 29 December 1943 at Camp Ritchie, Maryland
Inactivated 27 April 1946 at Verdun, France
Reorganized and redesignated 16 October 2010 as Headquarters and Headquarters Company, 51st Psychological Operations Battalion
Redesignated 16 March 2011 as Headquarters, Headquarters and Service Company, 7th Psychological Operations Battalion (organic elements concurrently constituted and activated with personnel from provisional units)
Activated at Fort Bragg, North Carolina, on 18 October 2011

 8th POB(A) – United States Central Command (CENTCOM)

Constituted 7 November 1967 in the Regular Army as the 8th Psychological Operations Battalion
Activated 1 December 1967 in Vietnam
Inactivated 27 June 1971 at Fort Lewis, Washington
Activated 13 September 1972 at Fort Bragg, North Carolina
Reorganized and redesignated 16 March 1990 as Headquarters and Headquarters Company, 8th Psychological Operations Battalion
Reorganized and redesignated 16 November 1995 as Headquarters, Headquarters and Service Company, 8th Psychological Operations Battalion (organic elements concurrently constituted and activated with personnel from provisional units)
In 1997, 8th POB's B Company (with a PACOM area of operations) was split-off from the 8th POB and designated PACOM Battalion (A); PACOM Bn. later formed the nucleus of 5th PSYOP Battalion when it was reactivated in 2003.

See also
Psychological Operations (United States)

References

External links
 4th Military Information Support Group (Airborne) – Official Site

004
Psychological Operations 004